is a passenger railway station located in the city of Nishitōkyō, Tokyo, Japan, operated by the private railway operator Seibu Railway.

Lines
It is located 16.3 kilometers from the terminus of the line at Seibu-Shinjuku.

Station layout
The station has two elevated opposed side platforms serving two tracks.

Platforms

History
Seibu-Yagisawa Station opened on 16 April 1927. Station numbering was introduced on all Seibu Railway lines during fiscal 2012, with Seibu-Yagisawa Station becoming "SS16".

Passenger statistics
In fiscal 2019, the station was the 58th busiest on the Seibu network with an average of 16,616 passengers daily.  

The passenger figures for previous years are as shown below.

Surrounding area
Fuji Kaido (Tokyo Metropolitan Road No. 8 Chiyoda Nerimada Radio) -
 Ome Kaido (Tokyo Metropolitan Road No. 4 Tokyo Tokorozawa Line, Tokyo Metropolitan Road No. 5 Shinjuku Ome Line)
 Shin-Oume Kaido (Tokyo Metropolitan Road No. 245 Suginamida Radio)
Yanagisawa Library / Yagisawa Public Hall
 Nishitokyo City Fujicho Welfare Hall
 Higashifushimi Park

See also
List of railway stations in Japan

References

External links

 Seibu-Yagisawa station information 

Railway stations in Tokyo
Railway stations in Japan opened in 1927
Stations of Seibu Railway
Seibu Shinjuku Line
Nishitōkyō, Tokyo